Justice Wainwright may refer to:

George L. Wainwright Jr., associate justice of the North Carolina Supreme Court
Dale Wainwright, associate justice of the Texas Supreme Court